Prickly pear may refer to:

Opuntia, a genus of cacti producing a fruit known as the prickly pear
Opuntia ficus-indica, the species which is the most common culinary source of prickly pear fruits
Consolea, a genus of cacti including species formerly classified in Opuntia
Prickly Pear (British Virgin Islands), the name of an island
Prickly pears in Australia, an invasive plant problem
 Prickly Pears (film), a 1981 Italian comedy film